Lawrence 'Larry' Roosevelt Worrell (born 28 August 1943 in Saint Thomas, Barbados) is a Barbadian-born former English first-class cricketer. Worrell was a right-handed batsman who bowled right-arm off break.

Worrell made his first-class debut for Hampshire, playing a single match in 1969 against the touring New Zealanders. During the 1969 season Worrell also represented Dorset in the Minor Counties Championship, playing against Berkshire, Cornwall and Somerset Second XI.

In 1971 Worrell returned to Hampshire for his second spell at the club. Worrell made his County Championship debut against Nottinghamshire. Worrell played 32 first-class matches for Hampshire, the last of which came against Leicestershire in 1972. Worrell scored 289 runs at an average of 11.56. Worrell scored a single half-century in his career, making exactly 50 runs. This was his highest first-class score. An off break bowler, Worrell took 65	wickets at an average of 32.55, with best figures of 5-67.

In 1972 Worrell made his only career List-A appearance against Lancashire. During the match Worrell was not required to bat or bowl. Worrell left Hampshire at the end of the 1972 County Championship season.

External links
Larry Worrell
Larry Worrell
Matches and detailed statistics for Larry Worrell

1943 births
Living people
Barbadian cricketers
People from Saint Thomas, Barbados
English cricketers
Hampshire cricketers
Dorset cricketers
Barbadian emigrants to the United Kingdom